Leidschenveen is the RandstadRail station in the centre of Leidschenveen in the neighbourhood Leidschenveen-Ypenburg in The Hague, Netherlands. The station features 2 platforms on a viaduct. These have a high and a low platform, with tram lines RandstadRail 3 and RandstadRail 4 using the lower platforms, and metro line E using the higher platforms. Leidschenveen is the station where the metro and the tram lines split, with the metro (line E) continuing to Rotterdam, while the trams (3 & 4) continue to Zoetermeer. The RandstadRail station opened on 29 October 2006 for the HTM tram services (4) and for the RET metro service (line E), and on 20 October 2007 for tram service 3.

Train services
The following services currently call at Leidschenveen:

Tram & Bus Services
These services depart from street level, directly below the station.

 Tram 19 (Leidschendam - Station Leidschenveen - Station Ypenburg - Ypenburg - Delft - Station Delft - Delft University)
 Bus 33 (Leidschenveen - Station Leidschenveen - Station Ypenburg - Ypenburg - Rijswijk - Station Rijswijk - Rijswijk De Schilp)

Gallery

Railway stations opened in 2006
RandstadRail stations in The Hague
2006 establishments in the Netherlands
Railway stations in the Netherlands opened in the 21st century